David Abraham Salazar Morote is a Peruvian politician. He has served as Governor of the Apurímac Region from 2007 to 2010.  In 2015, he was assigned to be part of Alan García's Popular Alliance presidential ticket with Lourdes Flores. García received 6% of the popular vote, dissolving the alliance.

Salazar is also the leader of the regional movement "Frente Popular Llapanchik".

Biography 
He was born in the city of Talavera, Peru, on June 12, 1953. He completed his primary studies in the town of Ongoy and the city of Talavera. High school began in Andahuaylas and culminated in the Leoncio Prado Military College, in El Callao, in 1969. Between 1970 and 1982 he studied industrial engineering at the Universidad Nacional Mayor de San Marcos. He has developed his professional life in the public and private sectors.

References

Living people

1953 births
People from Apurímac Region